Wojciech "Wojtek" Zarzycki (born 21 June 1982 in Wrocław, Poland) is a former Polish-Canadian footballer who last played for St. Catharines Wolves.

Career
His contract was not renewed for the 2008–2009 season. He moved back to his hometown and signed a contract with his former youth club St. Catharines Wolves.

Clubs
1999 – National Trainings Centre (NTC) Ontario
2000 – Werder Bremen (Youth)
2001 – Dartmouth College
2002 – Hamilton Thunder (Canadian Premier Soccer League)
2002 – Calgary Storm
2003–2005 – Sydney Crescent Star (Australia, NSW Premier League)
2007–2008 – Ferencvárosi TC
2008–2009 – St. Catharines Wolves

International career
He has played for Canada's U-16, U-17 and U-20 teams.

Personal life
Zarzycki holds dual Polish and Canadian citizenship, his hometown is St. Catharines, Ontario. Wojtek now a successful entrepreneur having several businesses.

References

External links
 Profile 
 

Calgary Storm players
Calgary Storm Prospects players
Canadian expatriate soccer players
Canadian expatriate sportspeople in Australia
Canadian expatriate sportspeople in Germany
Canadian expatriate sportspeople in Hungary
Canadian Soccer League (1998–present) players
Canadian soccer players
Dartmouth Big Green men's soccer players
Expatriate footballers in Germany
Expatriate footballers in Hungary
Expatriate soccer players in Australia
Ferencvárosi TC footballers
Association football goalkeepers
Hamilton Thunder players
Soccer people from Ontario
Sportspeople from St. Catharines
Sportspeople from Wrocław
Polish expatriate footballers
Polish expatriate sportspeople in Germany
Polish expatriate sportspeople in Hungary
Polish footballers
Polish emigrants to Canada
St. Catharines Roma Wolves players
USL League Two players
1982 births
Living people
Canada men's youth international soccer players